This is a list containing the Billboard Hot Latin Tracks number-ones of 1994. On the week ending November 12, Billboard updated the methodology to incorporate the Nielsen Broadcast Data Systems (BDS).

See also
Billboard Hot Latin Tracks

References

United States Latin Tracks
1994
1994 in Latin music